Junior is a category of athletics in which athletes compete under the age of 20 years. Countries all around the world compete in athletics. World Junior Athletics Competitions are held every two years which contain the best junior competitors in the world.

Description and development
The principle behind the category is to introduce young people into athletics. Participators in the competitions in this class may be athletes who have not completed their twentieth birthday on 31 December of the year the competition occurs.

Competitions

Championships
IAAF World U20 Championships, organized by the IAAF every 2 years
European Athletics U20 Championships, organized by the EAA every 2 years
African Junior Athletics Championships
Asian Junior Athletics Championships
Central American and Caribbean Junior Championships in Athletics
Pan American Junior Athletics Championships
Oceania Junior Athletics Championships, organized by the OAA every 2 years

Games
IWAS World Junior Games

See also
List of world under-20 records in athletics
International Association of Athletics Federations
European Athletic Association
Under-18 athletics
Under-23 athletics

References

External links
IWAS World Junior Games - IWASF

 
Age categories in athletics